The Flat River is a river in the U.S. state of Rhode Island. It flows approximately 5 km (3 mi). There are no dams along the river's length.

Course
The river is formed in West Greenwich by the confluence of Phillips and Acid Factory Brooks. The river then flows due south to Exeter where it flows into the Wood River.

Crossings
Plain Road in Exeter is the only crossing over the Flat River due to its short length.

Tributaries
Breakheart Brook is the Flat River's only named tributary, though it has many unnamed streams that also feed it.

See also
List of rivers in Rhode Island
Flat River (Kent County)

References
Maps from the United States Geological Survey

Rivers of Kent County, Rhode Island
Rivers of Washington County, Rhode Island
West Greenwich, Rhode Island
Exeter, Rhode Island
Rivers of Rhode Island
Tributaries of Pawcatuck River